Éva Jeanne Marion (5 March 1925 – 10 February 2019) was a French sprint canoeist who competed in the 1950s. Competing in two Summer Olympics, she earned her best finish of eighth in the K-1 500 m event at Melbourne in 1956.

References

External links 
 

1925 births
2019 deaths
Canoeists at the 1952 Summer Olympics
Canoeists at the 1956 Summer Olympics
French female canoeists
Olympic canoeists of France